Kohlit or Kohalit  is a place name used in rabbinic literature, and more famously in the Copper Scroll, a unique "treasure map" discovered among the Dead Sea Scrolls (DSS). It is unknown whether the two sources are referring to the same place.

Copper Scroll
Kohlit is a place, possibly a hill, mentioned several times in the Copper Scroll, one of the Dead Sea Scrolls. Kohlit has become something of a modern-day El Dorado for treasure hunters.

It is indicated as the area where the second Copper Scroll, containing a more detailed list, is buried.

Babylonian Talmud
Kohalit is also named in b. Qid. 66a (b. Qiddushin 66a; that is chapter 66a of tractate Kiddushin of the Babylonian Talmud) as an area east of the Jordan River where Alexander Jannaeus had led a successful military campaign.

References

Bibliography
 

Dead Sea Scrolls